= Western India Film Producers' Association =

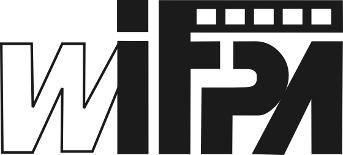
- Formation: 22 March 1960
- Headquarters: Mumbai, India
- Region served: India
- President: Shri Sangram Shirke
- Website: wifpa.net

The Western India Film Producers' Association (popularly known as WIFPA) is an organization for small film, regional film, and video album producers in North and West India.
